Emily Turner may  refer to:

Emily Turner (ice hockey)
Emily Turner (philanthropist)